Cercepiccola is a comune (municipality) in the Province of Campobasso in the Italian region Molise, located about  south of Campobasso.

Cercepiccola borders the following municipalities: Cercemaggiore, Mirabello Sannitico, San Giuliano del Sannio, Sepino.

References

External links
 Official website

Cities and towns in Molise